The Arnhem Coast, an interim Australian bioregion, is located in the Northern Territory, comprising an area of  of the coastal plains that characterises central Arnhem Land in the Top End of the Northern Territory.

See also

 Geography of Australia

References

Arnhem Land
Arnhem Land tropical savanna
Coastline of the Northern Territory
IBRA regions